The CONCACAF Gold Cup is North America's major tournament in senior men's football and determines the continental champion. Until 1989, the tournament was known as CONCACAF Championship. It is currently held every two years. From 1996 to 2005, nations from other confederations have regularly joined the tournament as invitees. In earlier editions, the continental championship was held in different countries, but since the inception of the Gold Cup in 1991, the United States are constant hosts or co-hosts.

From 1973 to 1989, the tournament doubled as the confederation's World Cup qualification. CONCACAF's representative team at the FIFA Confederations Cup was decided by a play-off between the winners of the last two tournament editions in 2015 via the CONCACAF Cup, but was then discontinued along with the Confederations Cup.

Since 1963, the Gold Cup was held 26 times and has been won by seven different nations, most often by Mexico (11 titles).

Nicaragua took part in the inaugural CONCACAF Championship in 1963, and in five tournaments total. However, they were never able to make an impact, losing seventeen out of their eighteen matches. In 1967, they drew the host team, Honduras, 1–1.

Overall record

Match overview

References

RSSSF archives and results
Soccerway database

Countries at the CONCACAF Gold Cup
Nicaragua national football team